Ibrahim Koneh (born 9 September 1994) is a Cameroonian professional footballer who plays as a left winger for Cypriot club Ethnikos Achna.

Club career
Koneh began his career with Portuguese side Boavista.

References

1994 births
Living people
Footballers from Yaoundé
Association football forwards
Cameroonian footballers
Cameroonian expatriate footballers
Ethnikos Achna FC players